Jack jumper ant, Myrmecia pilosula, an Australian ant

Jack jumper ant (also known as jumping jack) can also refer to several other species in the same genus:
Myrmecia fulvipes
Myrmecia nigrocincta
Taxa in the Myrmecia pilosula species complex:
Myrmecia banksi
Myrmecia croslandi
Myrmecia haskinsorum
Myrmecia imaii
Myrmecia impaternata
Myrmecia pilosula

Myrmeciinae
Insect common names